Julieta Valero (born 1971 in Madrid) is a Spanish poet who writes in Spanish.

Biography
She got a BA in Hispanic philology at Complutense University of Madrid, where she also continued studying a PhD in Modern and Contemporary Spanish Literature.

She published short stories, poems and articles in several literary medias such as Ínsula, ABCD de las artes y las letras, Turia, Vulcane, Minerva, El Maquinista (de la General), Diario de Poesía (Argentina), and usually collaborates with literary magazines Encubierta, Diálogo de la lengua, Fósforo, Babab, La dama duende and the Spanish Culture ministry's magazine Literaturas.

She also took part of numerous anthologies such as: Inéditos: 11 poetas (2002), 33 de Radio 3 (2004), Todo es poesía menos la poesía. 22 poetas desde Madrid (2004), 11-M. Poemas contra el olvido (2004), Poesía pasión (2004), Deshabitados (2008), Fuga de la nada. 16 propuestas poéticas (2009), El poder del cuerpo. Antología femenina contemporánea (2009), Palabras sobre palabras: 13 poetas españoles jóvenes (Chile, 2010) and Contrabando: una antología de la poesía española actual (Argentina, 2011).

She is the author of the poetry collection Altar de los días parados (Madrid, 2003), Los Heridos Graves (Barcelone, 2005, Prize IV Premio De Poesía Radio Joven de RNE-R3) and Autoría (Barcelone, 2010, Prize XXII Premio de Poesía Cáceres Patrimonio de la Humanidad, Prize Premio Ausiás March 2010, and was elected as one of the 10 best books of the year by the magazine Quimera and one of the best books of 2010 by Babelia and El Cultural), as well as a short essay for the re-edition of Teatro de operaciones (Madrid, 2010).

She delivered numerous lectures and took part of numerous international festivals of poetry (Festival de Poesía de Medellín, Colombia, 2007; Encuentro de Poetas del Mundo Latino, Mexico, 2010). Many of their poems have been translated in the United States, in France, in Italy, in Germany, in Morocco, in Brazil, in Slovakia and in Greece.

She co-directed and presented along with Mariano Peyrou for 5 years A ras de verso (radio broadcast of the Radio Círculo, belonging to the :es:Círculo de Bellas Artes of Madrid), a poetry programme in which they interview a Spanish or Latino American poet based on his texts. She belongs to the council and work as editor and poetry specialist in the creative writings centre Hotel Kafka. Since 2008 she is coordinator at the Foundation of the Poetry Centre José Hierro.

In 2011, she takes part, along with nine other Spanish poets (Jordi Doce, Rafael Reig, Fernando Aramburu, Francisco Javier Irazoki, Santiago Auserón, Pilar Adón, Javier Azpeitia, Marta Agudo and Vicente Molina Foix) to a tribute to Raymond Queneau on the occasion of the fifty years anniversary of his cult book Hundred Thousand Billion Poems publication, by creating a Spanish version called Cien mil millones de poemas, but with a sonnet they composed themselves taking a leaf out of one of the Queneau's sonnet of their choice. The edition has been made in such a way that each line is disposed on a strap that can be put up so to see the line of the next poem, making thus easier to compose each one of the hundred thousand billion poems.

List of major works

Poetry collections 
 Altar de los días parados. Bartleby, 2003.
 Los heridos graves. DVD, 2005.
 Autoría. DVD, 2010.
 Que concierne, Vaso Roto, 2015.

Participation in anthologies or collective collections 
 Antología (Asociación Colegial de Escritores de España, 1997)
 Inéditos: 11 poetas (2002)
 33 de Radio 3 (2004)
 Todo es poesía menos la poesía. 22 poetas desde Madrid, (2004)
 11-M. Poemas contra el olvido (2004)
 Poesía pasión (2004)
 Deshabitados (2008)
 Por dónde camina la poesía española. In Revista Letra internacional 98. Numéro 98. 2008. Fundación Pablo Iglesias, 
 Fuga de la nada. 16 propuestas poéticas (2009)
 El poder del cuerpo. Antología femenina contemporánea (2009)
 Palabras sobre palabras: 13 poetas españoles jóvenes (Chile, 2010)
 Contrabando: una antología de la poesía española actual (Argentina, 2011)
 Cien mil millones de poemas: homenaje a Raymond Queneau (2010)
 La nostalgia es una revuelta (with Oleñka Carrasco, 2017)

Essays 
 La integración silenciosa. In Ínsula: Revista de letras y ciencias humanas, Nº 702, 2005, pages 14–15.
 A brief essay on the occasion of the re-edition of Teatro de operaciones, by Antonio Martínez Sarrión (Madrid, Bartleby, 2010)

Awards and prizes 
 XVIII Premio de Poesía (Poetry prize) and the XVIII Premio de Cuentos (Tales prize) given by C.M.U. Isabel de España (1997)
 She was nominated for the prize Premio Adonáis de Poesía in 1998 and 1999
 IV Premio de Poesía Joven de Radio 3 for Los heridos graves (2005)
 XXII Premio de Poesía, Cáceres, Patrimonio de la Humanidad for Autoría (2009)
 Premio Ausiás March fir Autoría (2010)

References

External links 
 Report by Ángeles Maeso about Los heridos graves in Artes Hoy (2006)
 Report by Óscar Curieses about Los heridos graves in Deriva (2006)
 Report by Elena Medel about Autoría in Artecontexto (2010)
 Selection of poems by Julieta Valero in PoetasPoemas (2007)
 Website of the magazine Minerva
 Website of the magazine Encubierta
 Website of the magazine Diálogo de la lengua
 Website of the magazine Babab

1971 births
Spanish poets
People from Madrid
21st-century Spanish women writers
Living people
Spanish women poets